The Landloper is a 1918 American silent romance adventure film directed by George Irving and starring Harold Lockwood, Pauline Curley, Stanton Heck, William Clifford, Bert Starkey, and Gertrude Maloney. It is based on the 1915 novel of the same name by Holman Day. The film was released by Metro Pictures on April 1, 1918.

Plot

Cast
Harold Lockwood as Walker Farr
Pauline Curley as Kate Kilgour
Stanton Heck as Colonel Simon Dodd
William Clifford as Richard Dodd
Bert Starkey as Etienne Pickerone
Gertrude Maloney as Rose-Marie

Preservation
The film is now considered lost.

References

External links

1910s romance films
1918 adventure films
American romance films
American adventure films
1918 films
American silent feature films
American black-and-white films
Metro Pictures films
Films based on American novels
Films directed by George Irving
1910s American films
Silent adventure films
1910s English-language films